Colegio San José is a catholic school for boys in Rio Piedras, Puerto Rico that offers education from grades 6 to 12. The school is located on 6½ acres of land situated on a hill in Río Piedras.

Around 50–70% of graduates study in a university outside of the island, mainly in the continental United States. San José has 25 organized clubs, a varsity program in eleven sports (volleyball, basketball, baseball, tennis, golf, soccer, indoor soccer, cross-country, track and field, swimming, bowling), a junior varsity program with six sports (basketball, tennis, Cross Country, soccer, Swimming, Track and Field and volleyball) and a juvenile program with three sports (basketball, cross country and volleyball). San José has a student newsletter called La Lanza, award-winning student publication and a Student Council. Qualified students are selected as National Honor Society and National Junior Honor Society members. Recent victories achieved by the school during the school year 2008–2009 include winning 7 out of 8 categories during the Intercollegiate League of History and Geography's annual competition.

Colegio San José has had more than 100 National Merit Scholars and several nominations for Presidential Award, during the past five years.

The school was founded by the Society of Mary (Marianists) in 1938.

Curriculum

Middle school (7th-8th)
2 years of Ethics
2 years of Spanish
2 years of English
1 year of Social Studies (7th Grade)
1 year of Geography (8th Grade)
1 year of Pre-Algebra (7th Grade)
1 year of Algebra (8th Grade)
1 year of Life Science (7th Grade)
1 year of Physical Science and Chemistry (8th grade)
2 years of Physical Education - Health
1 year of Fine Arts (Music and Art)
2 years of Keyboarding and Word Processing

High School (9th-12th)
4 years of Ethics
4 years of Spanish
4 years of English
4 years of Mathematics
4 years of History
4 years of Science (Biology in 9th; Chemistry in 10th; Physics in 11th; Elective in 12th)
3 years of Physical Education (all grades except 12th)
1 year of Health

Elective Classes
All students in 10th grade and up can take elective classes.

Electives

For 10th graders
Art 1
Computer 1
French 1
Music 1
Psychology
Creative Writing and Oratory

For 11th graders
Art 2
Modern World Issues
Bioethics and Human Sexuality
Computer Science (AP program)
Economy and Political Science
French 2
Music 2
Creative Writing and Oratory

For 12th graders
Advanced Placement (AP) Computer Science
Drafting, Design, and Computer Aided Design (CAD)
Economics and Political Science
Français III
Introduction to Western Philosophy and Chaminade Theological Thought (Honors)
官話 I (Mandarin Chinese)
Advanced Placement (AP) Microeconomics and Macroeconomics
Instrumental Music (Requires interview, audition, and Maestro's approval)
Financial Accounting and Business Administration
Computer Programming in High Abstraction Languages
Introduction to the Harvard Turing Machine Computer Architecture  
Public Speaking, Creative Writing, and Forensics
Advanced Placement (AP) Univariate Calculus
Advanced Placement (AP) Univariate Statistics
Advanced Physics or Chemistry
Advanced Anatomy and Modern Medicine
Juventud Marianista, honours, or by the instructors' appointment French Revolution, Higher Education and the Theological Philosophy of Guillaume-Joseph Chaminade & the Society of Mary

Honor and Advanced Placement classes
Most of the classes at Colegio San José have honor and AP levels.
Starting in 9th grade, students who are among the first 25 in grade ranking have the option to take Honor Classes.
Starting in 11th grade, students have the option to select Advanced Placement (AP) Classes.

Advance Placement Classes
Spanish, English, History, Statistics, Calculus AB, Physics, Biology, Chemistry, Computer Science, Microeconomy, and Macroeconomy.

Community service
All grades have 2 annual community service activities, for example: going to Casa Cuna in San Juan to help orphan children.
Senior (12th grade) students must complete 40 hours of community service to receive their diploma.

Notable alumni

Engineering
 José Domingo Pérez II & III, P.E., Founding Partner Heir Apparent of Caribe Tecno CRL, Puerto Rico's fifth largest construction company.

Politics
 Aníbal Acevedo Vilá, Former Governor of Puerto Rico
 Jaime Areizaga-Soto, Former President of the Democratic Latino Organization of Virginia, and a former White House Fellow at the U.S. Treasury Department.
 Eduardo Bhatia, former Senator, Director of the Puerto Rico Federal Affairs Administration, Representative of the Governor in Washington and current senator of the Puerto Rico Commonwealth government.
 Jose Izquierdo Encarnacion, former Puerto Rico Secretary of State and Secretary of Transportation and Public Works
 Ron de Lugo, Former U.S. Virgin Islands Delegate to the Congress
 Felo Alejandro Bonete, former political analyst and current panel member of the "Puerto Rico: Volvemos A lo Mismo" analysis quartet. Current resident of Mayaguez "La Sultana de Puerto Rico".
 Sergio Peña Clos, former member of the Senate of Puerto Rico
 J. Gerald Suarez, Ph.D., former Director, Presidential Quality. Served in direct support of President Bill Clinton and President George W. Bush The White House
 Gabriel Maldonado, Secretary for the Department of Labor of Puerto Rico
 Javier Bayon, Director of the Puerto Rico Industrial Development Company
 Raul de Vidal y Sepulveda, Member of the Board of the Puerto Rico Industrial Development Company, Knighted by King Felipe VI of Spain

Business and professionals
 Hugo Poza Vice President, PhD - Homeland Security Strategic Business Area Raytheon Company
 Roger Maldonado, Esq., Partner, Balber Pickard Maldonado & Van Der Tuin, PC, New York
 Angel Torres – Former President of Bacardi-Martini Caribbean and current President of Plaza Provision Company
 Leonardo Cordero - Former President of the Puerto Rico Chamber of Commerce, President of Leonardo's, a tuxedo rental store.
 Dr. Angel M. Garcia Otano, physician in Naperville , IL
Dr. Benigno J. Fernandez, child-adolescent psychiatrist in San Antonio, Texas.
 Nelson De Jesus, Business Executive, The Coca-Cola Company in Atlanta, Georgia

Fine arts
 Danny Fornaris Producer of many Reggaeton and Techno artists, including Don Omar, among others
 Bruce John Graham, Colombian-American architect. Among his most notable buildings are the Inland Steel Building, the Willis Tower (formerly the Sears Tower), and the John Hancock Center.
 Gabriel Mora Quintero, known artistically as Mora, is a singer, writer, producer, and reggaeton artist who rose to prominence by releasing music on SoundCloud in mid-2017. He has collaborated with prominent members of the Puerto Rican urban scene such as Anuel AA, Myke Towers, Eladio Carrión, while also having writing credits for Jhay Cortez and Bad Bunny. He appeared on the latter's sophomore studio album, YHLQMDLG, and is signed to his label, Rimas Entertainment.
 Black Guayaba, a Grammy-winning Puerto Rican rock band that was formed in 2000. It is composed by Gustavo González (vocalist), Javier Morales (guitar), Carlos "Toro" Ortiz (bass), Carlos Colón (keyboards), and Gabriel Calero (drums).

Athletes
 Ramón Ramos, Puerto Rican basketball player, who played collegiate basketball at Seton Hall University and professionally for the Portland Trail Blazers
 Luis Allende, Puerto Rican basketball player
 Federico ("Fico") López Camacho (March 26, 1962 – November 6, 2006) was a Puerto Rican basketball player, member of the Guaynabo Mets.

External links
 Official website

Notes and references

Catholic secondary schools in Puerto Rico
Educational institutions established in 1938
1938 establishments in Puerto Rico